The Mini was offered in a number of limited editions that usually included a special combination of trim and badging, but some also included mechanical upgrades.

Anniversary editions

Mini 20

see below Mini 1100 Special

Mini 25

Year: 1984 (July)
Based on: Mini Mayfair
Engine: 998 cc
Exterior colour:
Silver Leaf Metallic (MME - BLVC421)
Exterior trim: Nimbus Grey
Decals/badges: Side and rear grey and red stripes with "Mini 25" logos
Interior: Luxury velvet with red piping, zip pockets fitted to front seats, red seat belts, leather-wrapped steering wheel
Equipment: 12-inch wheels, 14570R12 Pirelli Cinturato CN54 tyres, 8.4-inch front disc brakes, full-width wheel trim with arch extensions, 1275GT instrumentation, tinted glass, stereo radio cassette, twin door mirrors
Production: 3,500 in UK, 1,500 exported
Vehicles exported to Germany: no radio
Certificate issued to original owner

Mini 30

Year: 1989 (June)
Based on: Mini Mayfair
Engine: 998 cc
Exterior colour: Cherry Red and Black
Cherry Red (COG - BLVC843)
Black (PMA - BLVC90)with a antique gold coloured engine block and cylinder head
Exterior trim: Chrome bumpers and grille
Decals/badges: Coachlines and 1959-1989 crests
Interior: Half leather/lightning cloth, red piping
Equipment: Minilite-style wheels, 14570R12 Pirelli Cinturato CN54, security coded stereo, leather-bound copy of Rob Golding's book ("Mini")
Production: 3,000 for UK

Of the 3,000 produced for the UK, 2,000 were in Cherry Red and 1,000 were Black; 2,800 were manual and 200 had an automatic gearbox.600 were made with an optional sun roof.

Mini 35

Year: 1994 (1959-1994)
Based on: Mini Sprite
Engine: 4cylinder, 1275cc
Exterior colour(s): Arizona Blue, Nevada Red and Diamond White
Exterior trim: Chrome grille, lock set and door handles, auxiliary driving lamps. Electric adjustable headlamp aim. Export option: Webasto sunroof.
Decals/badges: Silver coachline with special decals.
Interior: Blue-and-pink "Jamboree" fabric; export option: all-leather, perforated leather inserts, colored piping that matched the exterior. Full walnut wood dash and door cappings.
Equipment: Opening rear windows, R652 stereo
Production: 1,000 for UK (RHD), 400 for export (LHD)

The 35 did not come with alloy wheels as standard. An automatic transmission was offered as an option. This limited edition was also offered in France, Italy and Japan, although it was identified by different names in those markets. Four hundred left-hand drive Mini 35 cars were also built for export to the Netherlands and Germany late in the model year (November 1994). They were painted British Racing Green Metallic and had all-leather interior with piping trim that matched the exterior color. They had 13-inch alloy wheels and extended wheel arches. The LHD cars also had the same silver coachlines, special decals, and a special wood-rimmed steering wheel with a 35th Anniversary horn button. Only a few were sold and the rest rebadged and sold as 1995 models.

Mini 40

Year: 1999 (April)
Based on: Mini Cooper S
Engine: 1,275 cc MPi (Multi-Point Injection)
Exterior colours:
Island Blue (JFU)
Mulberry Red (CDM)
Old English White (NNX)
Platinum sylver (MNX)
Solar red (EDM)
 Epson Green
 Black (PMF) 
Exterior trim: Chrome bumpers, grille, and handles. Optional Webasto electric sunroof.
Decals/badges: Gold or black  "Mini 40" bonnet badge, anniversary decal on the body sides, chrome "GB" on boot
Interior: Color-matched leather seats with contrasting piping, alloy dashboard, chrome-detailed instruments with "Mini 40" between the water temp. and fuel gauge, and a leather facia top, handbrake, and gear knob.
Equipment: CD Player, 13-inch Sportspack wheels, Sportspack arches, twin spotlamps, adjustable headlights
Production: 800 models, 400 for UK and Japan, the rest for the Europe.

London Collection

Mini Mayfair

Year: 1982 - 1996
Based on: Mini City
Engine: 998 cc / 1,275 cc
Exterior colour: Various
Exterior trim: Various coloured grille, door handles, bumpers, door mirrors, plastic wheel arch extensions and sill finishers, chrome from 1992. Silver plastic wheel covers
Decals/badges: Coachlines with "Mayfair" logos
Interior: Various colours, seats and door cards in Chalkstripe velour (1985–1988), Prism velour (1988–1991), Chevron velour (1992–1994), Windsor velour (1995–1996)
Equipment: 12-inch wheels with alloy option after 1984, 14570R12 Pirelli Cinturato CN54, opening rear side windows, radio, head restraints, locking fuel cap, tinted glass, tachometer, front disc brakes from 1984, brake servo from 1988

Mini Ritz

Year: 1985 (January)
Based on: Mini City
Engine: 998 cc
Exterior colour:
Silver Leaf(MME - BLVC421)
Exterior trim: Chrome, black-centered grille
Decals/badges: Red stripes with "Ritz" logos
Interior: Claret Red, Prussian Blue and Osprey Grey velvet
Equipment: 12-inch alloy wheels. 145/70R12 Pirelli Cinturato CN54 tyres
Production: 2,000 for UK, 1,725 for export from Italy

Mini Chelsea

Year: 1985 (February)
Based on: Mini City
Engine: 998 cc
Exterior colours:
Targa Red (CNE - BLVC641)
Silver Leaf (Japan) (MME - BLVC421)
Exterior trim: Grey bumpers and door handles
Decals/badges: Silver and red coachlines with "Chelsea" logos
Interior: Osprey Grey with red piping
Equipment: 12-inch alloy wheels, 14570R12 Pirelli Cinturato CN54, and opening rear side windows
Production: 1,500 for UK, more exported

Produced after the supply of Mini Ritz's had been sold.

Mini Piccadilly

Year: 1986 (May)
Based: Mini City
Engine: 998 cc
Exterior colour:
Cashmere Gold Metallic (GMD - BLVC422)
Exterior trim: Black bumpers, black-centred grille
Decals/badges: Twin coachlines with "Piccadilly" logo
Interior: Bitter Chocolate, Coffee and Claret velvet
Equipment: Full-width wheel trims, 14570R12 Pirelli Cinturato CN54, push button radio
Production: 2,500

Many examples were exported to France and Japan.

Mini Park Lane

Year: 1987 (January)
Based: Mini City
Engine: 998 cc
Exterior colour:
Black (PMA - BLVC90)
Exterior trim: Chrome bumpers and grille surround
Decals/badges: 'Park Lane' logos on doors and bootlid, stripes on rear side panels
Interior: Beige/Black velvet
Equipment: Full width wheel trims, tinted windows, opening side windows, stereo radio cassette
Tyres: 145/70R12 Pirelli Cinturato CN54
Production: 4,000 (1,500 for UK, 700 for Japan)

Mini Advantage

Also known as: Mini Masters (Germany)
Year: 1987 (June)
Based on: Mini Mayfair
Engine: 998 cc
Exterior colour:
Diamond White (NMN - BLVC655)
Exterior trim: Grey bumpers and door handles; black door mirrors; white wheel covers for the 12-inch steel wheels; Nimbus grey plastic wheel arch extensions and sill finishers
Decals/badges: Tennis-net theme on lower body sides with "Advantage" script logo; Advantage logo on upper right of bootlid
Interior: Flint Grey and Jade Green "Tennis Net" cloth on seats and door panels
Equipment: Tachometer, radio-cassette, tinted glass, opening rear windows with chrome surround
Production: 4,675 (2,500 for UK)

First launched in France in May 1987 to coincide with the French Open, the Mini Advantage also appeared in the UK in June of that year to be available during The Championships, Wimbledon.  Originally the name was to be the Mini Wimbledon, to match the London theme of the other names, but the All England Lawn Tennis Association would not allow this use of name with a tennis themed styling.

Colours

Mini Red Hot
Year: 1988 (January)
Based on: Mini City
Engine: 998 cc
Exterior colour:
GPO Red (CNL – BLVC 1073)
Exterior trim: Chrome bumpers and grille surround
Decals/badges: Black coachline and 'Red Hot' logos
Interior: Black velour
Equipment: Full width wheel trims, 14570R12 Pirelli Cinturato CN54, opening side windows, tinted glass, push button radio
Production: ~3,000 (~1,000 for UK)

Mini Jet Black
Year: 1988 (January)
Based on: Mini City
Engine: 998 cc
Exterior colour:
Black
Exterior trim: Chrome bumpers and grille surround
Decals/badges: Red coachline and 'Jet Black' logos
Interior: Black velour
Equipment: Full width wheel trims, 14570R12 Pirelli Cinturato CN54, opening side windows, tinted glass, push button radio
Production: 3,000 (1,000 for UK)

Mini Rose
Year: 1989 (January)
Based on: Mini City
Engine: 998 cc
Exterior colour:
White (NAL or BLVC 1218) with Pastel Pink (DME)roof
Exterior trim: Grey bumpers, wheelarches and grille center
Decals/badges: Coachlines with 'Rose' logo
Interior: Pink and Blue 'Crayons' fabric
Equipment: Full-width white wheeltrims, 14570R12 Pirelli Cinturato CN54, radio cassette
Production: 500

This 1960s theme was introduced in preparation for the Mini's 30th birthday.

Mini Sky
Year: 1989 (January)
Based on: Mini City
Engine: 998 cc
Exterior colour:
White (NAL or BLVC 1218) with Pastel Blue (JQN) roof
Exterior trim: Grey bumpers, wheelarches and grille center
Decals/badges: Coachlines with 'Sky' logo
Interior: Pink and Blue 'Crayons' fabric
Equipment: Full-width white wheeltrims, 14570R12 Pirelli Cinturato CN54, radio cassette
Production: 500

This 1960s theme was introduced in preparation for the Mini's 30th birthday.

Mini Racing
Year: 1988 (January)
Based on: Mini City
Engine: 998 cc
Exterior colour:
BRG Metallic (HAF - BLVC617) with white roof
Exterior trim: Chrome bumpers and black grille center
Decals/badges: Coachlines with 'Racing' logo
Interior: Black 'Crayons' fabric
Equipment: Full-width white wheeltrims, 14570R12 Pirelli Cinturato CN54, radio cassette
Production: 1,000

Some Mini Racing cars were fitted with the John Cooper 998 conversion. Otherwise, the 'Racing' was identical to the 'Flame' apart from the colour.

Mini Flame
Year: 1989 (January)
Based on: Mini City
Engine: 998 cc
Exterior colour:
Flame Red (COF - BLVC818) with white roof
Exterior trim: Chrome bumpers and black grille center
Decals/badges: Coachlines with 'Flame' logo
Interior: Black 'Crayons' fabric
Equipment: Full-width white wheeltrims, radio cassette
Tyres: 14570R12 Pirelli Cinturato CN54
Production: 1,000

Apart from the color, the 'Flame' was identical to the 'Racing'.

Mini Racing Green

Year: 1989 (April) to 1990 (February)
Based on: Mini City
Engine: 998 cc
Exterior colour:
BRG Metallic (HMN) with white roof
Exterior trim: Chrome bumpers and grille
Decals/badges: Coachlines with 'Racing' logo
Interior: Black 'Crayons' fabric
Equipment: Three-instrument binnacle, R361 Radio Cassette, option of automatic gearbox
Tyres: 145/70R12 Pirelli Cinturato CN54 
Production: 2,500 for UK (total for Racing Green, Flame Red & Checkmate), more exported

Fitted with a 3.44 final drive (as was found in the original 1961 Cooper), the 'Racing Green' could be bought with the Rover-approved John Cooper performance kit. Identical to the 'Flame Red' and 'Checkmate' apart from the color.

Mini Flame Red
Year: 1990 (February)
Based on: Mini City
Engine: 998 cc
Exterior colour:
Flame Red (COF - BLVC818)
Exterior trim: Chrome bumpers and black grille with chrome surrounds
Decals/badges: Coachlines with 'Racing' logo
Interior: Black 'Crayons' fabric
Equipment: Three-instrument binnacle, R361 Radio Cassette, option of automatic gearbox
Tyres: 145/70R12 Pirelli Cinturato CN54
Production: 2,500 for UK (total for Racing Green, Flame Red, and Check Mate), more exported

Fitted with a 3.44 final drive (as was found in the original 1961 Cooper), the 'Flame Red' could be bought with the Rover-approved John Cooper performance kit. Identical to the 'Racing Green' and 'Checkmate' apart from the colour.

Mini Checkmate
Year: 1990 (February)
Based on: Mini City
Engine: 998 cc
Exterior colour:
Black (PMA - BLVC90)
Exterior trim: Chrome bumpers, Black grille, Minilite alloy wheels
Decals/badges: Coachlines with 'Checkmate' logo
Interior: Black 'Crayons' fabric
Equipment: Three-instrument binnacle, R361 Radio Cassette, option of automatic gearbox
Tyres: 145/70R12 Pirelli Cinturato CN54
Production: 2,500 for UK (total for Racing Green, Flame Red, and Checkmate), more exported

Fitted with a 3.44 final drive (as was found in the original 1961 Cooper), the Checkmate could be bought with the Rover-approved John Cooper performance kit. Identical to the 'Racing Green' and 'Flame Red' apart from the colour.

Designer

Mini Designer
Year: 1988 (June)
Based on: Mini City
Engine: 998 cc
Exterior colour:
White (NMF - BLVC449)
Black (PMA - BLVC90)
Exterior trim: Nimbus grey
Decals/badges: Twin coachlines and "Designer" logos on the rear side panels and bootlid
Interior: Black and white striped fabric with ‘Mary Quant’ signatures embossed.
Equipment: Tinted glass, opening rear side windows, leather-rim steering wheel and two vanity mirrors in the sun visors, 14570R12 Pirelli Cinturato CN54
Production: 2,000

The Mini Designer was often called the "Quant" in reference to the Mary Quant-designed interior and Quant Daisy motifs on the steering wheel and bonnet badge.

Mini Paul Smith

Year: 1998 (March)
Based on: Mini Cooper
Engine: 1,275 cc
Exterior colour:
Paul Smith Blue (JFL - BLVC1269)
Also available in Black and White (Japanese market)
Exterior trim: Chrome grille, handles, and bumpers; green Great Britain isle badge on grille
Decals/badges: 24ct gold enamelled "Paul Smith" bonnet badge, Paul Smith rear window sticker
Interior: Black leather trim,  Paul Smith-scripted instrument graphics; Citrus Green glovebox interior, petrol tank and solid boot liner.
Equipment: Charcoal grey Minilite alloy wheels, 145/70R12 Pirelli Cinturato CN54, two spotlamps, Special "Paul Smith" denim jack & tool bag
Production: 300 for UK, 1,500 for rest of world

Paul Smith also designed a one-off Mini with 86 different-coloured stripes.

Cooper

Mini Cooper RSP
Year: 1990 (September)
Based on: Mini 30
Engine: 1,275 cc
Exterior colour:
Flame Red (CPQ - BLVC1000)
Black (PMF - BLVC644)
British Racing Green (HAF - BLVC617)
Exterior trim: Chrome Grille and bumpers, body-colored door mirrors and wheel arches
Decals/badges: White bonnet stripes with John Cooper signatures, Cooper badges
Interior: Black leather seat inserts, leather-bound steering wheel, red carpets
Equipment: Sunroof, twin driving lamps, tinted glass, alloy Minilite-style wheels, 145/70R12 Pirelli Cinturato CN54, Oil Cooler
Production: 1,050 for UK, 650 for Japan

The RSP (Rover Special Products) was the first Cooper in 21 years, and the first Mini with a 1,275 cc engine in 10 years. The most powerful carburettor engine (with the S works conversion) and the only non-Works Mini fitted with an oil cooler as standard.

It was an instant success and sold out even before cars began to appear in showrooms, which prompted Rover to put a Cooper in full-time production.

Mini Cooper Monte Carlo
Year: 1994 (January and July)
Based on: Mini Cooper 1.3i
Engine: 1,275 cc. The engine number on the UK cars is prefixed with 12A2EJ66 and the Japanese cars were prefixed with 12A2EJ77, though there is evidence that some have 12A2EJ34, same as the later Cooper 35 LE.
Exterior colour:
Flame Red (CPQ - BLVC1000)
Black (PMF - BLVC644)
Exterior trim:
Decals/badges: "John Cooper" signature decals, coachline with Monte Carlo decals
Interior: Wooden dashboard, red vinyl seats with cream cloth center panels, red seat belts, red carpets, red leather steering wheel, gear knob, and gaiter
Equipment: Gunmetal Minilite-style alloy wheels, 1457012 Pirelli Cinturato CN54, four fog lamps
Production: 200 for UK, 1000 for Japan.

The 1994 Monte Carlo was released to celebrate Paddy Hopkirk's return to the Monte Carlo Rally, 30 years after his original win.

Mini Cooper Grand Prix
Year: 1994 (August) - December 1996
Based on: Mini Cooper
Engine: 1,275 cc
Exterior colour: All available Rover Mini Cooper colors
Exterior trim: Chrome grille, handles and locks
Decals/badges: Coachlines with Grand Prix decals
Interior: Leather trim for doors, leather steering wheel and upholstery, glovebox-mounted plaque, walnut 6-gauge dash, door cappings and door pulls
Equipment: Koni adjustable dampers, four driving lamps, stainless sill plates
Modifications: big-valve, ported, balanced and flowed cylinder head, special cam and valve rocker assemblies, Weber Alpha fuel injection (except for the last few, which had a remapped Rover ECU), catalyzed Janspeed exhaust, revised air filter, oil cooler
Production: 35

Only two of the Grand Prix cars were made in a left-hand-drive configuration. The engine produced 86 hp.

Mini Cooper 35
Year: 1996 (May)
Based on: Mini Cooper
Engine: 1,275 cc single point fuel injection. The engine number on the UK cars is prefixed with 12A2EJ66 and the Japanese cars were prefixed with 12A2EJ34. These engine prefixes were shared with the 1994 Monte Carlo LE and is one of the key identifiers of a genuine Cooper 35 LE.
Exterior colour:
Almond Green (HAK - BLVC1212) with Diamond White roof (NMN - BLVC655) UK and Japan
Flame Red (RDV) with Diamond White roof (NMN - BLVC655) option for Japan only.
Exterior trim: Body-coloured door mirrors and wheel arches. Some Japanese green and red cars had white door mirrors. Some red cars had black plastic wheel arches.
Decals/badges: Coach lines with "Mini Cooper 1961-1996 Anniversary Edition" decals on sides and boot lid. 1.3i boot badges on UK cars and A panels on Japanese cars (some UK cars left the factory with A panel badges).
Interior: Almond Green cars had Porcelain Green leather seats with embossed Cooper logos; matching leather steering wheel and gear knob; "Anniversary" badge on steering wheel; wooden dash with cream-faced dials. Flame Red cars had Black leather seats with embossed Cooper logos; red leather steering wheel and gear knob; "Anniversary" badge on steering wheel; wooden dash with cream-faced dials but with no clock, the Japanese cars have air conditioning vents where the clock would be.
Equipment: UK cars - Gunmetal grey centred Minilite-style 4.5x12-inch alloy wheels with silver outer rims, two spotlights, two fog lamps. Japanese cars - silver alloy wheels and four fog type lamps instead of two spotlights & two foglamps of the UK model. All Japanese cars had factory fitted Air Conditioning, no alarm or immobiliser.
Tyres: 14570R12 Pirelli Cinturato CN54
Production: 200 for the UK market (5 of which received official John Cooper Garages S specification), 1501 were manufactured for Japan, the first (used in Rover's Japanese launch brochure) remained in the UK. Japanese cars featured air conditioning as standard, fixed rear quarterlights, and four fog style lamps (but still functioning as spot and fog). Rover Japan sources have said that no more than 10% of the Japanese cars were sold in Flame Red. Both the green and red Japanese models were available with the option of an automatic gearbox, something that was not available on the UK market cars.

The five, John Cooper S specification Cooper 35 produced 86 hp.  The conversion consisted of a replacement cylinder head, 1.5 roller rockers, Janspeed exhaust, K&N air filter element and modifications to the injection system. An oil cooler was also fitted.

These cars had the roof resprayed in Old English White with matching painted on bonnet stripes which run over the scuttle panel as a tribute to the Cooper Car Co racing cars.  Badging was updated with red enamelled Cooper inserts on the winged bonnet and boot badges, and the 1.3i badge on the boot lid was replaced by a Si badge. The original side graphics were retained.

They also had a unique dashboard and matching door capping's in elm rather than the walnut which featured on the factory car, and three signed ivory auxiliary dials were added, clock, voltmeter and oil pressure, rather than just a clock on the standard car.  Alloy door furniture was fitted, signed on some cars, but not all as the door furniture was redesigned around this time. A steering drop bracket was also standard on the Si.  The factory steering wheel and gear knob was retained.

Externally, in addition to the changes already highlighted, the Si gained clear indicator lenses, and polished metal Cooper wheel centre badges.

Only four of the five John Cooper S specification Cooper 35's still exist.

A number of cars were subsequently converted to S specification by John Cooper Garages, and the S pack cars can be distinguished from the original five cars by a plaque stating conversion number rather than car number.

Mini Cooper Sports LE
Year: 1998 (May)
Based on: Mini Cooper
Engine: 1,275 cc
Exterior colours:
Brooklands Green (HFB - BLVC1265)
Black (PMF - BLVC644)
Roof: White
Exterior trim: Chrome grille and handles; white mirrors
Decals/badges: Twin coachlines with BMC-style rosette with the words "Mini Cooper" to the rear; "V" flash in yellow (similar to British Vita Logo) above the front side indicator; BMC-style rosette with the words "Mini Cooper" on the right hand side of boot lid; white bonnet stripes
Equipment: Two spotlamps, sports suspension pack, 13x6-inch Sportspack wheels, Sportspack wheelarches
Interior: Walnut dashboard; dark green leather interior; green carpets; dark green leather and black steering wheel; dark green leather gear change boot and knob
Production: 100 (50 of each colour); there is some doubt that the production color split was not even and that more green than black cars were produced.

Built to commemorate the 30th anniversary of the Cooper's victory in four Saloon Car Championship races in 1968.

Mini Cooper S Touring
Year: 1997
Based on: Mini Cooper
Engine: 1,275 cc
Exterior trim: Stainless steel sill covers, alloy fuel flap, Cooper valve caps
Decals/badges: "Cooper S Touring" side decals, "Si" boot badge, John Cooper chassis plate under front seat
Interior: Leather steering wheel, walnut dashboard and door cappings, alloy door handles
Equipment:

On the Cooper S Touring, the Jack Knight 5-speed gearbox was available as an optional extra.

Mini Cooper S Sport 5
Year: 1997
Based on: Mini Cooper
Engine: 1,275 cc
Exterior trim: Chrome bumpers and grille
Decals/badges: Cooper S Sport 5 decals
Interior trim: Leather gear knob
Equipment: 13x6-inch Rover Sportspack alloy wheels, Sportspack wheelarches, 2 auxiliary driving lamps
Production: 30 - 50 No official records kept
Options:
Leather interior
Electric sunroof

The Sport 5 was very similar to the Cooper S Touring except that it was offered with the five-speed Jack Knight gearbox as standard.

Mini Cooper S Works
Year: 1999 (March)
Based on: Mini Cooper (John Cooper LE 40 Edition)
Engine: 1,380 cc
Exterior colour:
Brooklands Green
Roof: Old English White
Exterior trim: Chrome grille, door handles and bumpers
Decals/badges: Coachlines with "S works" decals. Special red-winged badges front and back.
Interior: Alloy dashboard, door cappings, door furniture, and foot pedals; leather steering wheel and gear knob
Equipment: CD player, 12-inch alloy wheels
14570R12
Production: 51, demand was so high that production increased from the original 25 (which have unique no. 1/25 edition plates on their dash glovebox). The 51st was unique with added extras as made specifically for Mrs John Cooper and sold at auction for 47,465.10 GBP at the Retromobile by Artcurial Motorcar in Paris 2016. All were converted by John Cooper Garages in Sussex from Mini John Cooper LE 40's 
Options:
Jack Knight 5-speed gearbox
Sportspack

With 90 hp output from its big-valve high-compression engine, the S Works is the most powerful Cooper ever made.

'Mini' John Cooper LE 40

Year: 1999 (August)
Based on: Mini Cooper
Engine: 1,275 cc
Exterior colour:
Brooklands Green (HFB - BLVC1265)
Roof: Old English White (NNX - BLVC1205)
Exterior trim: Chrome bumpers, grille, and handles
Interior: Grenadine red leather upholstery (with black piping for seats) on dash top, door liners, gear gaiter, and door pockets; red carpeting; black leather steering wheel, handbrake grip and gear knob; alloy dashboard
Decals/badges: John Cooper signature in chrome-plated steel.
Equipment: 13-inch Sportspack alloy wheels, Sportspack arches, two spotlamps, CD player
Production: 301 (51 converted to Mini Cooper S Works) officially only sold in UK as RHD

Built to commemorate the 40th anniversary of Cooper's victory in the Formula One World Championships 1959 & 1960. The Le 40 Editions were the most Expensive Minis ever sold as standard from the Factory. Also the only Mini not to registered as a Mini, instead as only 'John Cooper LE 40'

Mini Cooper Sport 500
Year: 2000
Based on: Mini Cooper
Engine: 1,275 cc
Exterior colours:
Tahiti Blue (JRJ - BLVC965)
Anthracite (LQW - BLVC1266)
Solar Red (CMU - BLVC1278)
British Racing Green (HAF - BLVC617)
Roof: silver
Exterior trim: Chrome bumpers and grille, silver bonnet stripes
Interior: Black and silver leather; alloy gear knob
Equipment: Four spotlamps, 13-inch alloy wheels, certificate signed by John Cooper, plaque inside glovebox, high level brake light
Production: 500 - Last ever to classic Issigonis design.

Export-only

Mini After Eight
Market: France / Spain / Portugal
Year: 1991
Engine: 998 cc
Exterior colour:
BRG
Exterior trim: Chrome bumpers and door handles; black mirrors and grille
Decals/badges: "After Eight" script on rear wing
Interior: Velvet seat covering
Equipment: 12-inch steel wheels with full wheel covers, 14570R12 Pirelli Cinturato CN54, front head restraints
Production: 1,500

This trim package adopted the branding of the After Eight chocolate mint in a partnership with its manufacturer, Rowntree & Company (then owned by Nestlé).

Mini Belfast
Market: Japan
Year: 1988

Mini Blue Star
Market: Germany
Year: 1996
Engine: 1,275 cc
Exterior colour:
Tahiti Blue Metallic (JRJ)
Exterior trim: Body-colored wheel arches
Decals/badges: Coachlines with "Blue Star" script decals
Interior: Full blue leather seats with gray piping; elm dashboard, door cappings, door pulls, steering wheel, gear knob, and handbrake grip; blue leather gaiter; Magnolia instruments; black carpets
Equipment: 13x6 alloy "Sportspack" wheels, "German" wheel arches, twin spotlamps
Production: 500

The steering wheel used in the Blue Star is a RAID model 13D.

Mini Brighton
Market: Japan
Year: 1988

Mini Brooklands
Market: Germany
Year: 1998
Engine: 1,275 cc
Colour: RNE
Exterior: Charcoal, also called Niagara or Charcoal Black (LVD 1207)
Roof: White Diamond (NAL 1218)
Other colour details: white bonnet stripes, white side-mirrors, white coachlines with "Brooklands" decals on sides.
Equipment: Koni dampers, Rover Sport Pack 13×6 inch wheels, Rover Sport Pack wheel arches, two beam lights and two fog lights in front of grill, rear fog light.
Interior: black leather seats with cream piping and Cooper logos, black leather stearing wheel, black leather gear knob, walnut dashboard, Cooper chrome instrument panel showing speed, fuel, water temp, oil temp, voltage and clock, alloy gas pedal.
Production: 600

Mini Cooper Serie 300

Market: Italy, France, Germany, Netherlands, Belgium, Luxembourg
Year: 1975
Based on: Innocenti Mini Cooper 1300 Export (MK III)
Engine: 1,275 cc
Exterior colour:
Beaver (Castoro), white roof
Black, white roof
Bluette, white roof
Green, black roof
Lobster (Aragosta), black roof
Night Blue, white roof
Peach (Pesca), black roof
Red, black Roof
White Ivory, black roof
Exterior trim: light-green tinted windscreens, black colored front and rear bumpers, roof drains without drip rails
Equipment: Britax-Sabelt sunroof, black plastic wheel arches, 4.5x10 inches Rostyle rims
Interior: 36 centimeters Hellebore steering wheel, all-cloth interior, lowered rear storage compartments
Production: ~300 (between 300 and 399)

This car, also called “Last 300 Series” or “Super Cooper” is known as the last Italian classic Mini as the Innocenti production ended with this limited edition model. Originally fitted to counter the competition of the just launched Mini 90 (introduced in the same year), it is now considered as one of the highest-quality and best-finished Minis of all time.

Mini Cosmopolitan
Market: France
Year: 1993
Engine: 1,275 cc
Exterior colour:
Black
Exterior trim: Black grille and mirrors; chrome bumpers
Decals/badges: "Cosmopolitan" text on rear wing
Interior: Fabric-covered seats and door panels
Equipment: Philips CD player
Production: 1,000

Mini Jubilee
Name: Mini 1000 Jubilee  (15 Years)
Market: Netherlands
Year: 1975
Build in Spain by AUTHI
Exterior Colour: Brown with White vinyl roof
Engine: 1000 cc
Beam Lights build in grill
Jubilee logo on A-panels
Rostyle Wheels
Production: 1000 cars

Mini Kensington
Market: Japan, Italy, Netherlands, Belgium, Germany
Exterior color:
Tahiti Blue
Surf Blue
Nightfire red
British Racing Green
Whitehall Beige
Dark Brown
Interior: Leather seats
Equipment: Air conditioning
Year: 1996-1997

Mini Lady
Market: Netherlands, Belgium, Austria
Year: 1977
Engine: 998 cc
Engine: 850 cc 
extra: colour-coded Umbrella
200 Cars for the Dutch Market
full Wooden Dashboard with Lady-badge
Exterior: Special Blue Striping

Mini Lapagayo
Market: Netherlands
Year: 1998
Engine: 1,275 cc
Exterior colour:
Tahiti Blue Metallic (JRJ)
Exterior trim: Chrome grille, bumpers, and door handles; white door mirrors; white fuel filler cap
Decals/badges: Coachlines with "Mini Cooper" decals; "Lapagayo" striping and logos on lower section of doors
Interior: Blue leather and yellow Alcantara upholstery; walnut dashboard and gear knob; tinted windows
Equipment: 12-inch Minilite alloy wheels painted white; two spotlamps; package including polo shirt and umbrella
Production: 20
Named for the Lapagayo fashion brand.

Mini Monza
Market: Germany
Year: 1998-1999
Engine: 1,275 cc MPI
Exterior colour:
Tahiti Blue Metallic (JMP - BLVC65))
Exterior trim: Body-colored Sportpack wheel arches, "Monza" petrol cap. 
Decals/badges: Coachlines with crossed-checkered-flag "Monza" decals; optional silver roof chequers and chequered bonnet stripes.
Interior: Black leather seats; burl walnut dashboard and door cappings; black carpets; Magnolia instruments with 3 additional Magnolia gauges, leather and wood steering wheel, aluminium and wood gear knob.
Equipment: 12x5 or optional 13x6 Minilite alloy wheels, Sportspack wheel arches, two spotlamps, two fog lamps and rear fog lamp, chrome exhaust-end
Production: 250 for Germany, though a few later reimported to GB through Mini Sport.

Mini Printemps
Market: France
Year: 1979
Engine: 998 cc
Exterior colour:
Beige metallic
Production: 500

Mini S
Market: France
Year: 1979
Engine: 998 cc
Exterior colour:
Bleu Nuit
Black

Mini Silver Bullet
Market: Germany
Year: 1995
Engine: 1,275 cc
Exterior colour:
Silver Metallic
Exterior trim: Body-coloured wheel arches
Decals/badges: Coachlines with "Silver Bullet" decals
Interior: Full black leather seats with red piping; elm dashboard, door cappings, door pulls, and gear knob; black leather gaiter; Magnolia instruments; black carpets
Equipment: 13x6 five-spoke "Revolution" alloy wheels, Sportspack wheel arches, twin spotlamps
Production: 400 for Germany

The steering wheel used in the Silver Bullet is a RAID model 13D.

Mini Silverstone
Market: Germany
Year: 1993
Engine: 1,275 cc
Exterior colour:
Black
Decals/badges: Coachlines and crossed-checkered-flag "Silverstone" decals
Interior: Leather seat edging with cloth inserts and red piping; birdseye maple dashboard, door cappings, and gear knob; maroon carpets
Equipment: 6x13 "Revolution" alloy wheels, "German" wheel arches

Mini Twinings
Market: France
Year: 1991
Engine: 998 cc
Exterior colour:
Black

Mini Woodbury
Market: France
Year: 1992
Engine: 1,275 cc
Exterior colour:
Black
Interior: Beige leather stamped with "Arc de Triomphe"; walnut dashboard
Equipment: 12-inch steel wheels with full wheel covers
Production: 500

Mini John Player Special
Market: German
Year: 1980
Engine: 1000cc
Exterior colour:
Black, Gold Stripe, JPS Decals & Vinyl/Matte Roof.
Interior: Black Recaro Seats; Walnut dash made by Rokee.
Equipment: 10-inch Gold ATS Classic wheels, Abarth exhaust system, Leather covered steering wheel.
Production: Unknown.

Special

Mini 1000 'Stripey' LE

Year: 1976 (January)
Based on: Mini 1000
Engine: 998 cc
Exterior colours:
Brooklands Green
White
Exterior trim: Chrome, chrome mirrors
Decals/badges: Gold coachlines
Interior: Striped orange MGB-style 'deckchair' seats
Equipment: Reclining seats, face-level vents, two door mirrors
Production: 3,000

Mini 1100 Special
Year: 1979 
Based on: Mini 1000
Engine: 1098 cc
Exterior colours:
Metallic Silver (MMB - BLVC202)
Metallic Rose (CMM - BLVC303)
Exterior trim: Clubman rear bumpers (fitted to front and rear), black slatted grille, vinyl covered roof
Decals/badges: Wide shaded side stripes, "Mini" laurel leaf A-panel decals, "Special" grill badge, "Mini 1100" boot badge
Interior: Tartan check trim, two-spoke steering wheel with "Mini" laurel leaf decal, plastic centre console and plastic passenger side under dash tray (the only production model fitted with a centre console and under dash tray as standard)
Equipment: Exacton 5x10 inch alloy wheels with plastic centre caps and plastic wheel nut covers, Dunlop Formula 70 165/70x10 tyres, plastic wheel arch extensions (the first production model to use this later ubiquitous design), wing-mounted side indicators (mounted higher on the wings and longer in length than other Mini models), twin door mirrors, 1275 GT instrumentation and Clubman upper dash facia. MW/LW radio, cigar lighter and clock fitted within the centre console.
Production: 5,100

Built to celebrate the Mini's 20th anniversary, the 1100 Special was the only round-nose Mini to be supplied with the 1098 cc engine in the UK. British Leyland supplemented the original run of 2,500 cars with an additional 2,600 due to its popularity.

Mini 1100 Special (BE-version)
Year: 1976-81 
Based on: Mini 1000  MkIII
Engine: 1098 cc
Exterior colours: any Mini colour available
Exterior trim: 
 before 1979 : wing-mounted side indicators close to wheel arches, twin door mirrors,
 after 1978 : wing-mounted side indicators (mounted higher on the wings and longer in length than other Mini models), twin door mirrors, like British special,  Clubman rear bumpers (fitted to front and rear), black slatted grille, vinyl covered roof, 
Decals/badges:  "Mini Special" boot badge
Interior: 
 before 1979 : 3 gauge central oval dash 
 after 1978 Tartan check trim, two-spoke steering wheel with "Mini" laurel leaf decal
Equipment: Exacton 5x10 inch alloy wheels with plastic centre caps and plastic wheel nut covers, Dunlop Formula 70 165/70x10 tyres, plastic wheel arch extensions (the first production model to use this later ubiquitous design),
Production: unknown in Seneffe

Built between for Belgium market in Seneffe from 76-78 as an experiment to test demand. The success on the continental market inspired  BLMC to launch it, in 1979 for Mini's 20th anniversary, the 1100 Special was the only round-nose Mini to be supplied with the 1098 cc. The model was popular in the Benelux market and somewhat in France.

Mini Sprite
Year: 1983 (August)
Based on: Mini City
Engine: 998 cc
Exterior colours:
Cinnabar Red (CMT - BLVC399)
Primula Yellow (FMP - BLVC442)
Exterior trim: Black bumpers and grille centre
Decals/badges: Tapering side stripes with "Sprite" logo
Interior: Grey Herringbone seat facings
Equipment: Exacton 5x10 inch alloy wheels with 165/70x10 tyres, Mini Special wheel arch extensions, twin door mirrors, 1275 GT instrumentation and Clubman upper dash facia
Production: 2,500

The Mini Sprite was released in anticipation of the 25th anniversary of the Mini. Its name revived the old Austin-Healey name last used in 1971. The Sprite was intended to be an intermediate trim level between the "City" and the "Mayfair".

Mini Studio 2
Year: 1990 (June)
Based on: Mini City
Engine: 998 cc
Exterior colour:
Black (PDE - BLVC373)
Nordic Blue (JQV - BLVC863)
Storm Grey (LOZ - BLVC867)
Exterior trim: Chrome grille, black bumpers
Decals/badges: Studio 2 Decals, green stripe and three green dots below the window line
Interior: Doeskin seat covers with green diagonal stripe, three-spoked steering wheel with unique green Mini badge.
Equipment: full-width wheeltrims, opening rear quarterlights and an R750 stereo, 12' steel wheels with hubcaps, front disc brakes.
Production: 1,500 for UK (RHD), 500 for Germany (LHD)

The Studio 2 name was first used on the Metro in 1987/88.

Mini Neon
Year: 1991 (February)
Based on: Mini City
Engine: 998 cc
Exterior colour:
Nordic Blue (JQV - BLVC863)
Pearlescent Caribbean Blue (UME - BLVC911)
Exterior trim: Chrome bumpers, door handles, grille surround and exhaust tailpipe
Decals/badges: Coachlines with "Neon by Mini" decals.
Interior: Chevron velour with Neon badge on steering wheel.
Equipment: Full-width wheel trims, standard passenger side door mirror, R280 digital radio/cassette, hinged rear windows
Production: 1,500

The "Neon" was originally meant to be produced in Caribbean Blue Pearlecent, but problems with the new paint meant that the production version was made in Nordic Blue,
at least one was produced in Caribbean Blue and sold by Startins of Redditch. The "Neon" decals on the car still had a Caribbean Blue border, which was meant to blend with the paintwork, so looked a little odd on the Nordic cars.

Mini Cabriolet
Year: 1991 (June)
Based on: Mini Cooper
Engine: 1275 cc
Exterior colour:
Pearlescent Cherry Red
Exterior trim: "LAMM" body kit
Decals/badges: Cabriolet badge on boot. Coachlines with "LAMM" decals
Interior: Wood-grain dash, three-instrument binnacle, wooden door cappings and gear knob, Mayfair seats and trim, leather steering wheel
Equipment: Clarion CRH50 stereo, Revolite alloy wheels
Production: 100

Rover first ordered 75 cars from Lamm Autohaus, and this was shortly followed by an order for an additional 25. After the success of this limited edition, Rover went into full-time production on the Mini Cabriolet.

Mini British Open Classic
Year: 1992 (June)
Based on: Mini Mayfair
Engine: 1,275 cc
Exterior colour:
British Racing Green (HNA)
Exterior trim: Chrome bumpers, grille, and handles; body-color door mirrors; black wheelarch extensions and sill finishers
Decals/badges: Coachlines with "British Open Classic" decals and coat of arms
Interior: Stone Beige Countryman Tweed upholstery with leather inserts and green piping, cream leather steering wheel, matching doorcards and seatbelts, label stitched to seats reading "By Appointment to Her Majesty the Queen"
Equipment: Electrically operated full-length Webasto sunroof, Minilite-style alloy wheels, R552 stereo, opening rear windows
Tyres: 145/70R12 Pirelli Cinturato CN54
Production: 1,000 for UK

A similar folding sunroof that appeared on the British Open Classic had been an option in 1991 only in Japan, but the model was known as the 'Canvas Top.' Only 400 were made.  Some unsold models were registered as 1992s, but this model was only officially sold in Japan in 1991. One difference between the British Open Classic and the Japanese Canvas Top model was the fact that the Japanese canvas top could be opened from the rear as well as the front.  Opening from the rear was done manually by first releasing two latches on the inside rear of the top akin to those commonly found on convertible tops, and physically pushing the top forward.  Opening from the front was accomplished via an electric motor just like in the British Open Classic.  

The British Open Classic was also made for other markets in larger numbers, these can be identified by either being left hand drive, fuel injected or no tweed inserts in the seats. UK spec Open Classics were all carburetor engines but the shell is single point injection as it has the bracket on the bulk head to the right of the carburetor. Unlike most limited editions the Open Classic has opening rear windows and a two pod dash, i.e. no rev counter. The export version has a three pod dash (this seems to vary, a German version and an Italian version are known, which have two pod dashes, so further research please). Also, there are export versions in existence, which are black, again, known are German and Italian cars. The Italian version also has beige cloth upholstery, without leather trimmings, also prepared for a radio (speakers, cables and antenna, but delivered without actual stereo unit).

Mini Italian Job
Year: 1992 (October)
Based on: Mini Mayfair
Engine: 1,275 cc
Exterior colour:
Flame Red (COF - BLVC818)
Metallic British Racing Green (HAM - BLVC1216)
Diamond White (NMN - BLVC655)
Electric Blue (NMN - BLVC997)
Exterior trim: Body-coloured wing mirrors, white grilles, black bumpers.
Decals/badges: Bonnet stripes, "Italian Job" badge, crossed Italian and British flag decals
Interior: Black tweed, three-spoke steering wheel with Italian flag on steering wheel and front seats
Equipment: Tinted glass, twin driving lamps, opening rear quarter windows
Tyres: 145/70R12 Pirelli Cinturato CN54
Production: 1,000 for UK, 750 for Italy

Inspired by the 1969 film "The Italian Job", these cars were made to look like Coopers though they produced only 50 hp.

Mini Rio

Year: 1993 (June)
Based on: Mini Sprite
Engine: 1,275 cc
Exterior colour:
Black (PDE - BLVC373)
Pearlescent Caribbean Blue (UME - BLVC911)
Metallic Polynesian Turquoise (UMG - BLVC966)
Exterior trim: Chrome bumpers
Decals/badges: "Rio" Decals on flanks and boot
Interior: Black with bright green Spira panels on doors and seats.
Equipment: R562 radio/cassette
Tyres: 145/70R12 Pirelli Cinturato CN54
Production: 750

The colours offered on the Rio were usually extra-cost options on the standard Mini Sprite. The Rio name was also used on the Rover Metro in 1993.

Mini Tahiti
Year: 1993 (October)
Based on: Mini Sprite
Engine: 1,275 cc
Exterior colour:
Tahiti Blue (JMP - BLVC65)
Exterior trim: Chrome bumpers
Decals/badges: "Tahiti" Decals with silhouetted palm trees on flanks and boot
Interior: Black trim with blue-and-black door and seat inserts, colour-coded seat belts
Equipment: Minilite-style alloy wheels, R652 radio/cassette
Tyres: 145/70R12 Pirelli Cinturato CN54
Production: 500

Mini Sidewalk / Mini Tartan 
Also known as: Mini Tartan (Japan)
Year: 1995 (June)
Based on: Mini Sprite
Engine: 1,275 cc
Exterior colour:
Charcoal Metallic
Kingfisher Blue
Diamond White
British Racing green (pearl)
Exterior trim: Chrome bumpers
Decals/badges: "Sidewalk" decals
Interior: Red seat belts and blue tartan trim
Equipment: Radio/cassette
Production: 1,000 for UK

Mini Equinox
Year: 1996 (April)
Based on: Mini Sprite
Engine: 1,275 cc SPi
Exterior colour:
Amaranth Purple (KMN - BLVC1223)
Charcoal Grey (LVD - BLVC574)
Platinum Silver (MNX - BLVC1209)
Exterior trim: Chrome bumpers and grille
Decals/badges: Coachlines with "Equinox" Decals (astrological theme)
Interior: Purple and black moon-and-stars printed fabric seat inserts with vinyl edging
Equipment: Tinted glass, opening rear quarter windows, R660 radio/cassette, alarm/immobilizer
Production: 750

Mini ERA Turbo
Year: 1990
Engine: 1,275 cc Turbocharged
Exterior colour:
Flame Red (COF - BLVC818)
British Racing Green (HAF - BLVC617)
Other special order colours:
Black
White
Silver
Exterior trim: Body kit, grille with ERA badge, five-spoke wheels with ERA emblem, rear windscreen wiper
Decals/badges: Turbo bonnet badge, ERA badge fitted to rear, ERA ID plate on slam panel
Interior: Available in full- or half-leather modified Austin Metro seats
Equipment: Two speakers fitted to parcel shelf, radio (same manufacturer)
Production: 99 UK & 337 Japan
96 bhp@8 psi turbo boost

Registers
Mini Limited Editions Register
Mini Special Register
Mini 25 Register
Mini Paul Smith Register
Mini RSP Register
Mini Cooper Sport 500 Register
Mini Equinox Register
Mini Designer Register
Mini Sky & Rose Register
Mini Cooper 35 Register

References

Mini